Stanley Eugene Tolliver, Sr. (October 29, 1925 – January 3, 2011) was an African American attorney, school board president, civil rights activist, and radio talk show host.

Early life and career
Born in Cleveland, Ohio, Tolliver graduated from East Technical High School in 1944 where he won the state championship in the 440-yard dash and the Ohio State Vocal Contest. His early hobbies were playing the violin and heavyweight boxing. After graduation, he went on to earn his bachelor's degree at Baldwin - Wallace College (now Baldwin Wallace University) in 1948. During his time there, he majored in opera, ran on a relay team with Olympic gold medalist Harrison Dillard and was the founding president of Beta Sigma Tau, a pioneering interracial fraternity that merged into Pi Lambda Phi. Tolliver went on to attend the John Marshall School of Law (now the Cleveland State University College of Law) pass his bar exam in 1953 and to earn a Legum Doctor degree in 1968 and a Juris Doctor degree in 1969. In the interim Tolliver was drafted into the U.S. Army, served in the  Counterintelligence Corps from 1951 to 1953 where he was a private first class.

In 1965 Tolliver and Cleveland attorney Harold Tiktin were two of the legions of voting-rights activists descended on the South in an effort to end black disenfranchisement. They volunteered there for a week, assisting as legal advisors to those who were attempting to register to vote for the first time, following the passage of the Voting Rights Act. He served as legal counsel for the Reverend Dr. Martin Luther King Jr., the Southern Christian Leadership Conference, and the Congress of Racial Equality. In 1968, he represented Fred Ahmed Evans, who was convicted of murder in a Glenville Shootout with police. During the case, Ahmed Evans' brother William "Bootsie" was shot to death in the doorway of Tolliver's Quincy Avenue office. Police did not charge the shooter and said he was thwarting a robbery. Tolliver occasionally had a contentious relationship with law departments and often accused police of misconduct and prosecutors of selectively pursuing convictions. He also believed that police who killed someone should undergo alcohol tests as promptly as possible – as civilian suspects are required to. In 1968, shotgun blasts from a drive-by shooting barely missed family members in the living room of his house.

Later career
In 1970, Tolliver became the only African American attorney involved in the defense of the students charged in the Kent State shootings. Together with other Ohioans, Tolliver also led the call for the Cleveland Public Schools to desegregate. In 1977 he was admitted to the U.S. Supreme Court. After state and local boards of education were found guilty of operating a segregated school system, Tolliver was appointed to the Committee on the Office of School Monitoring and Community Relations in 1978. From its inception, Tolliver's law practice was characterized by an audacious defense of underdogs. Sometimes Tolliver met with failure, as with Melvin Bay Guyon, who killed FBI Agent Johnnie Oliver, or Mark DiMarco, who kidnapped and murdered Mary Jo Pesho in the 1990s. In 1981 he was elected to membership on the Cleveland Board of Education and in his twelve years of service, was elected board President twice. Beginning with this appointment, he often spoke on the value of more parental involvement in the lives of Cleveland schoolchildren and was firmly entrenched in the issues of civil rights in the community. He was also a lifelong member of the NAACP.

Other volunteer work
Tolliver served as Chairman of the Board of Trustees at Antioch Baptist Church, was elected president of the Norman S. Minor Bar Association and the local chapter of the National Conference of Black Lawyers. For his work with the NAACP, he was awarded the coveted NAACP Freedom Award and a street was named after him in Cleveland for his work there.

Radio show
Tolliver hosted the weekly radio show, "Conversations with Stanley E. Tolliver, Sr." on WERE-AM. The show took telephone calls from listeners and consisted of a dialogue about politics and events in Cleveland, with emphasis on the plight of poor people and the effort to improve the lives of minorities and include black history in the school curriculum.

Personal life
A lifelong runner, Tolliver completed a marathon in Hawaii in his 50s, won a 400-meter race at a Senior Olympics and jogged through University Circle in his 80s. Tolliver was married to the former Dorothy Olivia Greenwood in 1951. They remained married for 49 years until her death in 2001; their marriage produced three children. He also sported a large collection of wide brimmed hats and was a soloist in the Sanctuary and Gospel choirs, and the  Men's Chorus at Antioch Baptist Church.

Death
Tolliver died on the morning of January 3, 2011 at the Stokes Cleveland VA Medical Center due to complications from congestive heart failure (it was erroneously stated in the news that he died from cancer). He was 85 years old.

References

Mississippi Burning, clevelandmagazine.com

External links
Biographical sketch at "The History Makers"
Obituary by Phillip Morris

1925 births
2011 deaths
African-American lawyers
Ohio lawyers
American talk radio hosts
American anti-racism activists
American community activists
Senior Olympic competitors
NAACP activists
Cleveland–Marshall College of Law alumni
Radio personalities from Cleveland
Lawyers from Cleveland
University of Pennsylvania Law School alumni
United States Army soldiers
Activists from Ohio
20th-century American lawyers
20th-century African-American people
21st-century African-American people